Kristijan Župić (born 30 June 2000) is a Serbian professional footballer who plays as a goalkeeper for Proleter Novi Sad.

Club career

Early years
Born in Novi Sad, Župić started training football in "Bolesnikov" football academy at the age of 6. He made his first football steps as a regular player, but later decided to be a goalkeeper. He passed A.C. Milan junior training camp in 2010, where he was elected for the best goalkeeper. Župić came through the Proleter Novi Sad youth categories, where appeared until the end of 2016. He also joined the first team, staying on the bench as an unused substitution in 6 fixture match of the 2016–17 Serbian First League season, against Inđija.

Bačka
At the beginning of 2017, Župić signed with Serbian SuperLiga side OFK Bačka. He made his professional debut in last fixture of the 2016–17 season at the age of 16, under coach Zoran Govedarica, replacing Nemanja Jevrić in 80 minute of the match against Spartak Subotica, played on 21 May 2017 at the Subotica City Stadium. Joining the game, Župić became the youngest goalkeeper in the Serbian SuperLiga. At the beginning of 2018, Župić signed a six-month scholarship contract with the club. Turning an adult in summer same year, Župić extended the deal with the club, penning his first four-year professional contract until 2022.

Loan to Cement
Following the contract extension, Župić moved on loan to the Serbian League Vojvodina side Cement Beočin. Župić made his debut in an official match for Cement on 16 September, in a draw against Železničar Pančevo, and kept clean sheet.

Loan to NK Osijek II
Beginning of 2019, Župić is on loan to Osijek II, who is a winner of Junior HNL II championship of 2019.

Career statistics

Club

References

External links
 
 
 

2000 births
Living people
Footballers from Novi Sad
Association football goalkeepers
Serbian footballers
Serbian expatriate footballers
FK Proleter Novi Sad players
OFK Bačka players
FK Cement Beočin players
NK Osijek players
FK Javor Ivanjica players
Serbian SuperLiga players
Serbian expatriate sportspeople in Croatia
Expatriate footballers in Croatia